CFGX-FM is a Canadian radio station, which broadcasts at 99.9 FM in Sarnia, Ontario. The station broadcasts an adult contemporary format with the brand name The Fox. Its main competitors are WGRT and WBTI.

CFGX-FM can be heard in the eastern parts of Michigan as far west as Lapeer and well into the Thumb region, and used to have a listenable signal in much of Macomb County before Detroit's WCHB (now WMUZ) signed on an FM translator at 99.9 (which now relays WDMK-HD2). The station can be heard as far east as Strathroy (farther east, co-channel CHJX-FM in London interferes) and Chatham to the south.

The station was launched with the callsign CJFI on September 14, 1981 by Rogers Communications, the owner of the city's existing CKJD. CJFI featured easy listening music with some simulcasting of Top 40-formatted CKJD overnights. The station adopted its current call sign and format on February 26, 1988.

CKJD and CJFI were sold to Maclean-Hunter subsidiary Blue Water Broadcasting on July 16, 1987. When Rogers acquired Maclean-Hunter on December 19, 1994, the Blue Water stations were spun off to Blackburn Radio.

In July 2008, the station applied to increase power. That application was approved on September 3, 2008.

References

External links
 99.9 The Fox
 

Fgx
Fgx
Radio stations established in 1981
Fgx
1981 establishments in Ontario